"I Don't Wanna Live Without Your Love" is a hit song written by Diane Warren and Albert Hammond for the group Chicago and recorded for their album Chicago 19 (1988), with Bill Champlin singing lead vocals. It is the first Chicago single to feature Champlin performing all lead vocals himself.  The first single released from Chicago 19, it reached number three on the U.S. Billboard Hot 100 chart. The B-side of the single was "I Stand Up" written by Robert Lamm and Gerard McMahon. The song was featured in the Netflix original movie Death Note, which is based on the anime of the same name.

Charts

Year-end charts

References 

1988 songs
1988 singles
Chicago (band) songs
Songs written by Diane Warren
Songs written by Albert Hammond
Song recordings produced by Ron Nevison
Full Moon Records singles
Reprise Records singles